The Encyclopedia of the Founders and Builders of Israel is mainly a "Who's Who" Encyclopedia of the yishuv and the first 22 years of the state of Israel.

Background
The Encyclopedia was compiled and published by David Tidhar over 23 years and contains 19 volumes and about 6,000 biographies of Jewish leaders and settlers in Palestine from the 19th century up to the year 1970. Touro College, together with the Tidhar family, established a website containing the Encyclopedia and made it freely available to the public.

References

External links
 Internet version of the full Encyclopedia of the Founders and Builders of Israel by David Tidhar (Hebrew, with Google translation to English)

Yishuv
Hebrew-language encyclopedias
Multi-volume biographies
Israeli biographies
Biographical dictionaries